The 1985 Bologna Open was a men's tennis tournament played on outdoor clay courts in Bologna, Italy that was part of the 1985 Nabisco Grand Prix circuit. It was the inaugural edition of the tournament and was played from 10 June until 16 June 1985. Third-seeded Thierry Tulasne won the singles title.

Finals

Singles
 Thierry Tulasne defeated  Claudio Panatta 6–2, 6–0
 It was Tulasne's 1st singles title of the year and the 2nd of his career.

Doubles
 Paolo Canè /  Simone Colombo defeated  Jordi Arrese /  Alberto Tous 7–5, 6–4

References

External links
 ITF tournament edition details

Bologna Outdoor
Bologna
1985 in Italian tennis